Žyrmuny is an agrotown in the Voranava District, Grodno Region of Belarus, 16 kilometres from the Lithuania–Belarus border. 

The place is first mentioned in chronicles of the 15th century when it was the property of the Butrym family. In 1437 a church was established by the merchant Wojciech Kuciuk. In 1513 it became the property of Field Hetman Jerzy Radziwiłł. In the 17th century it was transferred to the Zawisza family and in 1624 Jan Zawisza build a new church which burned down in the middle of the century. In the early 18th century the village reverted to the Radziwiłłs and was granted town privileges by Polish king August II. In 1788 another church was established, the St. Cross Church, which was designed by Jan Podczaszyński, father of the famous Polish architect Karol Podczaszyński, who was also born in the village. This church survives to this day.

See also
Žirmūnai, a district of Vilnius.

Agrotowns in Belarus
Populated places in Grodno Region
Vilnius Voivodeship
Lidsky Uyezd
Nowogródek Voivodeship (1919–1939)